Highland Township is the name of some places in the U.S. state of Pennsylvania:

Highland Township, Adams County, Pennsylvania
Highland Township, Chester County, Pennsylvania
Highland Township, Clarion County, Pennsylvania
Highland Township, Elk County, Pennsylvania

Pennsylvania township disambiguation pages

it:Highland (Pennsylvania)